The Baskin Building, at 332 W. Main St. in Artesia, New Mexico, was built in 1904–05.  It was listed on the National Register of Historic Places in 1990.

It is a two-story building which was designed to serve as a combination of functions, including as a hotel.

References

Hotels in New Mexico
Post office buildings on the National Register of Historic Places in New Mexico
National Register of Historic Places in Eddy County, New Mexico
Early Commercial architecture in the United States
Buildings and structures completed in 1904